St. Peter and St. Paul, known commonly as Buckingham Parish Church, is the Anglican parish church in Buckingham, Buckinghamshire, England. The current rector is Revd Will Pearson-Gee who leads a range of services; traditional and modern in style, most of which are on Sunday. The church is prominently located in the centre of the historic core of Buckingham on Castle Hill.

History 
The previous church located in Prebend End dated from before 1445 but no records have been found before this date apart from a reference to it in the Domesday Book of 1086. It had a history of the tower and spire collapsing several times and in 1776 it collapsed for the final time. Browne Willis had a great desire to restore the church to its former glory following the last repairs in 1698, but the new spire was too ambitious.

A new site became available on Castle Hill and the decision was taken to move the church. The foundation stone for the new church was laid by Robert Bartlett, bailiff of Buckingham, on 25 November 1777 at a grand ceremony, including the singing of a hymn specially composed for the occasion followed by the roasting of an ox with beer and bread supplied by Earl Temple. On 6 December 1780, the church was consecrated by Thomas Thurlow, Bishop of Lincoln following a detailed petition letter sent to the Bishop which described the reasons for the new church. The petition read as follows:

“That the Tower of the ancient fabric of the Parish Church of Buckingham having fallen down destroyed the Great parts of the Church, and that the inhabitants were unable to rebuild the same, that in consideration of such inability, the Right Hon Richard Earl Temple generously under took by Virtue of an act of Parliament to build a new Church... that the said Church is now completely finished for the celebration of divine worship, by the Right Hon George Earl Temple, Heir to the said Richard Earl Temple. That the ground on which the said Church is erected, together with commodious passages thereto and an area surrounding the same has been freely given and legally conveyed for the use of the said Parish by the Right Hon Ralph Earl Verney of the Kingdom of Ireland."

Architecture 
The Church design originally had just two elements: the tower with octagonal plan spire, and the nave with a sanctuary formed within this main volume and was quite a simple Georgian building. The current Victorian Gothic Revival church seen today is the result of  many 19th-century alterations by George Gilbert Scott including the significant structural repairs and new buttresses and internal alterations started in 1860, a chancel added in 1865 and a porch in 1867. The new chancel was funded by a £358 donation from the Duke of Buckingham and Chandos.

The additions were consecrated by Bishop Wilberforce in 1867, leaving little of the original 18th-century church left untouched.

External links 

 Buckingham Parish Church: St Peter & St Paul's Church

References 

Church of England church buildings in Buckinghamshire
Grade I listed churches in Buckinghamshire
Churches completed in 1780
18th-century Church of England church buildings
Saint Peter and Saint Paul